Vasili Ivanovich Fiyev (born 7 May 1982) is a former Russian professional football player.

Club career
He played in the Russian Football National League for FC Baltika Kaliningrad in 2003.

Personal life
He is a twin brother of Nikolai Fiyev.

References

External links
 

1982 births
Russian twins
Twin sportspeople
Living people
Russian footballers
Association football midfielders
FC Dynamo Stavropol players
FC Baltika Kaliningrad players
FC Chernomorets Novorossiysk players
FC Zhemchuzhina Sochi players